"Abrázame" (Eng.: "Hold Me") is a song by Mexican band Camila. It was released in 2006, as the first single from the album Todo Cambió. In 2008, the song was re-recorded with Brazilian pop singer Wanessa and included on her album Total and also as a bonus track on the Brazilian pressings of Todo Cambió.

Remix version
The band recorded a Spanish-Portuguese version with Brazilian singer Wanessa Camargo. The version was released as single on 14 May 2008 from Brazilian version of Todo Cambió to promote the band in the country, and also included in the re-release of Wanessa's fifth studio album Total (2008).

Charts

Certifications

References

2006 singles
2008 singles
Male–female vocal duets
Wanessa Camargo songs
Songs written by Mario Domm
2006 songs
Sony BMG singles